Mile End was a parliamentary constituency centred on the Mile End district of the East End of London.  It returned one Member of Parliament (MP)  to the House of Commons of the Parliament of the United Kingdom.

The constituency was created for the 1885 general election, and abolished for the 1950 general election.

Boundaries 

1885–1918: In this period the constituency was a division of the parliamentary borough of Tower Hamlets in east London. The seat was centred upon the community of Mile End including the Mile End Road, which adjoined the Charrington Brewery. The brewery was headed by Spencer Charrington, MP for the area between 1885 and 1904.

Before 1885 the division was administered as part of the county of Middlesex. It formed part of The Metropolis from 1855 to 1889. In 1889 there was a change in the administrative arrangements covering the constituency, with the creation of the County of London. In 1900 London was divided into Metropolitan Boroughs. The Mile End Old Town Parish Vestry was abolished, with Mile End becoming part of the Metropolitan Borough of Stepney.

1918–1950: The constituency became a division of Stepney. The Representation of the People Act 1918 defined it as comprising four local government wards of Mile End Old Town (Centre, North, South and West) as well as the ward of Whitechapel East.

In 1945, the seat became one of only two seats in that Parliament to have a Communist MP elected. Phil Piratin had been a local activist and borough councillor.
 
In 1950 the constituency was abolished. Its territory became part of the Stepney seat.

Members of Parliament 

Notes:-
 a The Liberal Unionist Party formally merged into the Conservative Party in 1912.
 b Coalition Unionist 1918–1922.

Election results

Elections in the 1880s

Elections in the 1890s

Elections in the 1900s

Elections in the 1910s

General Election 1914–15:

Another General Election was required to take place before the end of 1915. The political parties had been making preparations for an election to take place and by the July 1914, the following candidates had been selected; 
Unionist: Harry Levy-Lawson
Liberal: Bertram Straus

Elections in the 1920s

Elections in the 1930s

Elections in the 1940s
General Election 1939–40

Another General Election was required to take place before the end of 1940. The political parties had been making preparations for an election to take place and by the Autumn of 1939, the following candidates had been selected; 
Labour: Daniel Frankel
Conservative:

References

External links 
 Boundaries of Parliamentary Constituencies 1885–1972, compiled and edited by F.W.S. Craig (Parliamentary Reference Publications 1972)
 British Parliamentary Election Results 1885–1918, compiled and edited by F.W.S. Craig (The Macmillan Press 1974)
 British Parliamentary Election Results 1918–1949, compiled and edited by F.W.S. Craig (Macmillan Press, revised edition 1977)
 Social Geography of British Elections 1885–1910. by Henry Pelling (Macmillan 1967)

Politics of the London Borough of Tower Hamlets
Parliamentary constituencies in London (historic)
Constituencies of the Parliament of the United Kingdom established in 1885
Constituencies of the Parliament of the United Kingdom disestablished in 1950